The Hurricanes are an American football team located in Kodaira, Tokyo, Japan.  They are a member of the X-League.

Team history
1978 Team founded by Hitachi, Ltd. business group. Team named the Hitachi Hurricanes.
1999 Team promoted from X3 to X2. 
2003 Renesas Electronics becomes new team sponsor. Team renamed the Renesas Hurricanes.
2004 Won X2-X1 promotion match against Club Huskies 41-33. Promoted to X1 for the following season.
2005 Finished 6th in the Central division (0 wins, 6 losses).
2006 Finished 6th in the Central division (0 wins, 6 losses). Won X1-X2 replacement match against Bullseyes-Tokyo 26-0.
2009 Renesas Electronics ends sponsorship of the team. Team renamed the Hurricanes. Finished 5th in the Central division (2 wins, 5 losses).
2010 Finished 4th in the Central division (2 wins, 6 losses). Lost X1-X2 replacement match against Sagamihara Rise 0-57. Demoted to X2 for the following season.
2012 Finished 1st in the X2 East division (9 wins, 0 losses). Won X2-X1 promotion match against Fuji Xerox 20-13. Promoted to X1 for the following season.
2015 Finished 6th in the Central division (0 wins, 7 losses). Team demoted to X2 for the following season.

Seasons

References

External links
  (Japanese)

American football in Japan
1978 establishments in Japan
American football teams established in 1978
X-League teams